Kazi Ebadul Hoque (1 January 1936 – 14 July 2022) was a Bangladeshi judge who served in the appellate division of the Supreme Court of Bangladesh. He was awarded Ekushey Padak in 2016 by the Government of Bangladesh for his contribution to Bengali Language Movement. His daughter, Kazi Zinat Hoque, is a Judge on the High Court Division of the Bangladesh Supreme Court.

Life and career
Hoque originated from Feni District. He served as the President of United Nations Association of Bangladesh until his death.

Hoque died in Dhaka, Bangladesh on 14 July 2022, at the age of 86.

References

1936 births
2022 deaths
Bangladeshi judges
People from Feni District
Recipients of the Ekushey Padak
20th-century judges